Wolka Zaleska may refer to the following places in Poland:
Wólka Załęska, Grójec County, Masovian Voivodeship (east-central Poland)
Wólka Załęska, Piaseczno County, Masovian Voivodeship (east-central Poland)
Wólka Zaleska, Masovian Voivodeship (east-central Poland)
Wólka Zaleska, Podlaskie Voivodeship (north-east Poland)